Eugene Rousseau may refer to:

Eugene Rousseau (saxophonist) (born 1932), American saxophonist
Eugène Rousseau (chess player) (c. 1810–1870), French chess player
 (1827–1890), French designer of glassware